Grange School is a ‘private’ day  school in Ikeja, a city, local government and capital of Lagos State, Nigeria. Grange School was founded in 1958 by a group of British expatriates, to provide education of equivalent standard to that which obtains in the UK. The school's Patron is the Deputy British High Commissioner to Nigeria.

As part of the 40th anniversary in September 1998, the Board felt it was time to add a secondary school for continuity and stability in the education of the pupils.

The Primary Phase prepares pupils for the key stage 2 CheckPoint examinations

The secondary school, therefore, continues into Key Stage 3 culminating in the Checkpoint Exams and Key Stage 4 which culminates in the IGCSE (International General Certificate of Secondary Education). Both exams are under the auspices of the University of Cambridge Local Examination Syndicate (UCLES).

Grange School's population is projected as 430 girls and boys in the Primary Section which is from Reception class to Year 6, between the ages of 4+ and 11. There are 326 pupils in the secondary phase being, Year 7 to Year 11, between the ages of 11 and 16+.  The School Policy maintains a class size of 11-19

Intellectual activities 
The school encourages students to participate in charity events as well as other extra-curricular activities such as chess, arts and crafts, swimming, tennis, football, and basketball.
Anita Orkeh of Grange School, G.R.A Ikeja, came in second in the scrabble competition.
Grange Grange School of Lagos, Nigeria made their debut at the U13 WSG in 2020 led by team Captains Toni Ogunlade & Jordan Demuren. And had podium first finish on the on all days (athletics, swimming and football) leading to them taking the first position meaning Grange now holds the title of the world champions of U13 sport.
Grange has competed in The Kids Literature Quiz since its Nigerian inauguration and on Thursday 6 February 2020, Grange School Team 1 -, Ayana Okuneye (Y8), Dara Ogunwale (Y8), Kanyinsola Olateju (Y8), Danielle Oye-Igbemo (Y7), emerged first.

Creative and performing arts
Wonderful performance by Grange pupils at DIDI Museum "An Evening with J.P. Clark"

Grange Pupils performed the 'Joseph And His Technicolor Dreamcoat' Musical as the Muson Center.

References

External links 
Grange School Website
http://internationalschoolguide.com/nigeria/lagos/grange_school_2.htm
http://kidslitquiz.com

Schools in Lagos
Cambridge schools in Nigeria
Secondary schools in Lagos State
Educational institutions established in 1958
1958 establishments in Nigeria